Elijah Babbitt (July 29, 1795 – January 9, 1887) was a Republican  United States Representative from Pennsylvania.

Babbitt was born in Providence, Rhode Island.  He moved with his parents to New York State in 1805.  He received an academic education and moved to Milton, Pennsylvania, in 1816.  He studied law, was admitted to the bar in March 1824 and commenced practice in Milton.

He moved to Erie, Pennsylvania, in 1826 and continued the practice of law.  He served as attorney for the borough and subsequently for the city of Erie.  He was prosecuting attorney for Erie County, Pennsylvania, in 1833 and served as deputy attorney general for the State in 1834 and 1835.  He was a member of the Pennsylvania House of Representatives in 1836 and 1837 and served in the Pennsylvania State Senate from 1843 to 1846.

Babbitt was elected as a Republican to the Thirty-sixth and Thirty-seventh Congresses.  He was not a candidate for reelection in 1862.  He resumed the practice of law and died in Erie in 1887. He was interred in Erie Cemetery.

Sources

The Political Graveyard

1795 births
1887 deaths
19th-century American politicians
Republican Party members of the Pennsylvania House of Representatives
Pennsylvania lawyers
Republican Party Pennsylvania state senators
Politicians from Erie, Pennsylvania
Politicians from Providence, Rhode Island
Republican Party members of the United States House of Representatives from Pennsylvania
19th-century American lawyers
Burials in Pennsylvania